The Cauca climbing mouse (Rhipidomys caucensis) is a species of arboreal rodent in the family Cricetidae. It is endemic to Colombia, where it is found in montane forest at elevations from 2200 to 3500 m.

References

Musser, G. G. and M. D. Carleton. 2005. Superfamily Muroidea. pp. 894–1531 in Mammal Species of the World a Taxonomic and Geographic Reference. D. E. Wilson and D. M. Reeder eds. Johns Hopkins University Press, Baltimore.

Rhipidomys
Endemic fauna of Colombia
Mammals of Colombia
Mammals of the Andes
Mammals described in 1913
Taxonomy articles created by Polbot
Taxa named by Joel Asaph Allen